Campbell County High School (CCHS) is a public high school located outside of Alexandria, Kentucky, United States. It is the only high school in the Campbell County School District and the nickname is the "Fighting Camels." It feeds from Campbell County Middle School and the district's five elementary schools: Crossroads Elementary, Campbell Ridge Elementary, Reiley Elementary, Cline Elementary, and Grant's Lick Elementary. The school has several sports programs, including baseball, basketball, and football and soccer as well as an incredible, award winning band program, the Band of Pride.

CCHS also has wrestling and track & field teams, producing numerous state finishers in their history.  Including back to back state champion wrestling teams in 1990 -91 and a top 25 national ranking in 1991. In 2010 the girls track program won their first team state championship.

It serves portions of Campbell County, including Alexandria, California, Claryville, Cold Spring, Crestview, Highland Heights, Mentor, and Wilder.

Academic team
Campbell County High School also has an academic team. Christopher Manker is the current head coach of the team and is assisted by Doctor Linda Weber, Linda Mauser, and Donn Manker, the former coach of the academic team, and father of Christopher Manker.  This team has been to several competitions in various places, including Vanderbilt University, at which they competed in NAQT format. Also they have been to state competition in 2009, 2010 and 2011.  To get to state, they competed at both the district and regional levels. District Play is between schools in a small area. Regional competition is a competition between the winners of several districts.

Future Problem Solving
In Future Problem Solving, or FPS, students are given a futuristic scenario, in which a short story in which many possible problems of the future are presented through character(s) and plot, and then the students come up with solutions to the problems. FPS is part of the Governor's Cup competition.

Drama
Campbell County High School also has one of the most recognized theater programs in the state of Kentucky, with multiple Cappies awards over the past several years. These drama productions were previously under the direction of Mr. J. Bertucci but are currently under the direction Ms. C. LaNicca. These productions are performed by the students under Ms. LaNicca's watch. Their production history includes American classics, Shakespearean comedy, British comedy, comedy of manners, modern drama, audience-interactive mystery, and a variety of classic and current Broadway musicals.

Student life
At Campbell County High School, the Freshmen are in a separate part of the building. This part of the building, the "Freshman Academy" has most of the core content classes for the freshmen. Their electives are still outside of the freshman academy. All other grades are not mainly confined to one part of the building. Some students may go to Campbell's Area Technology Center for job training.

The Band of Pride is an incredible student program.

Notable alumni
Glenn Withrow, American actor, director, producer and writer
Herschel Turner, former American football tackle and guard
B. J. Whitmer, American professional wrestler

References

External links
 Campbell County Schools web site for CCHS
 CCHS Academic Team Makes State

Educational institutions in the United States with year of establishment missing
Schools in Campbell County, Kentucky
Public high schools in Kentucky